McGrory is a surname. It is derived from the Irish and Scottish Gaelic surname Mac Ruaidhrí.

People with the surname
Amanda McGrory (born 1986), American wheelchair racer
Bob McGrory (1891–1954), Scottish footballer
Frank McGrory (born 1933), American lawyer
Jackie McGrory (1941–2004), Scottish footballer
Jimmy McGrory (1904–1982), Scottish footballer and manager
John McGrory, Scottish footballer
Johnny McGrory (1915–1998), Scottish boxer of the 1930s and '40s
Mary McGrory (1918–2004), American journalist and columnist
Matthew McGrory (1973–2005), American actor
Scott McGrory (born 1969), Australian cyclist
Shaun McGrory (born 1968), English footballer

Citations

References

Anglicised Irish-language surnames
Anglicised Scottish Gaelic-language surnames
Patronymic surnames